Wallington is a small village and civil parish in the North Hertfordshire district, in the county of Hertfordshire, England, near the town of Baldock. The population of the civil parish at the 2011 Census was 150. Nearby villages include Rushden and Sandon. It shares a parish council with Rushden.

The Church of St Mary is a Grade II* listed building lying at the southern end of the village.  The nave, west tower and windows date from the mid-15th Century.  The chancel was rebuilt in 1864.

The Icknield Way Path passes through the village on its 110-mile journey from Ivinghoe Beacon in Buckinghamshire to Knettishall Heath in Suffolk.

George Orwell
The author George Orwell lived in a small cottage at no 2 Kits Lane, known as The Stores, in the village from 1936 to 1940, and at occasional weekends (when he was otherwise mainly in London) until he gave up the lease on the cottage in 1947. A commemorative plaque was placed there in 1989 by Hertfordshire County Council. This plaque is however not accurate, in that it refers to Orwell living at the Stores until 1940, whereas he had the lease until April 1947, and did stay at the house from time to time until at least his wife Eileen's death (1945).  He had married his first wife Eileen O'Shaughnessy at the village church on 9 June 1936. Orwell wrote his notable book Animal Farm in 1944 probably much of it while he was at the village and certainly drew on his experiences there for inspiration, especially Manor Farm and The Great Barn.  The farm in the village is, as in the book called Manor Farm.

Other notable books that he wrote while he lived in the village include  Homage to Catalonia,  and The Road to Wigan Pier (which he had largely researched before he moved to Wallington, but which was written and published after his arrival.)  Many of his notable essays, reviews and articles in various journals and collections, were also written during this period.

In 2011 and 2012 the village was involved in the George Orwell Festival, of Letchworth and Wallington.

References

External links
 Wallington Village Website
 Rushden & Wallington Parish Council
 The George Orwell Festival
 Church of St Mary, Wallington at British Listed Buildings
 Orwell's Life in Wallington

Villages in Hertfordshire
Civil parishes in Hertfordshire